ATEC may refer to:

 Atec, an aerospace and energy component manufacturer
 ATEC v.o.s., a Czech aircraft manufacturer
 Autism Treatment Evaluation Checklist, a psychological assessment tool
 United States Army Test and Evaluation Command
 Inland Railway aka Australian Transport and Energy Corridor
 ATEC Technologies, a startup technology company that specializes in Formal Verification.